The Phoenix-Talent School District #4 is a public school district in the U.S. state of Oregon. It serves the cities of Phoenix, Talent and parts of Medford. There are three elementary schools in the district: Phoenix Elementary, Talent Elementary, and Orchard Hill Elementary. The one middle school is Talent Middle School and the one high school is Phoenix High School. District enrollment in grades K–12 stood at 2,800 students as of 2010.

Demographics
In the 2009 school year, the district had 47 students classified as homeless by the Department of Education, or 1.7% of students in the district.

References

External links
 

School districts in Oregon
Education in Jackson County, Oregon
Phoenix, Oregon
Talent, Oregon
Education in Medford, Oregon